Eviota guttata, the spotted dwarfgoby, is a species of ray-finned fish from the family Gobiidae, the "true gobies". It is found in the western Indian Ocean.

Description 
Eviota guttata has a total of 6–7 spines in its dorsal fins and a total of 8–9 soft rays. The anal fin has a single spine and 8-9 soft rays. It closely resembles Eviota albolineata and its counts or measurements match closely.

Distribution 
Eviota guttata was originally described from specimens taken in the Red Sea and the Gulf of Oman, with the holotype being from an Ethiopian Navy base, Massawa, in modern Eritrea. It is now known to occur in the western Indian Ocean including the Maldives, Seychelles, Red Sea, Gulf of Aqaba, and the Gulf of Oman. Records from the Pacific are probably misidentifications of similar species of Eviota gobies, such as Eviota theresae in Fiji.

Biology 
Eviota guttata occurs in inshore areas near continental and island shores where it is associated with shallow reefs with a mixture of coral and algal growths.

References

External links 
 

guttata
Vertebrates of the Arabian Peninsula
Fish of the Comoros
Fauna of the Maldives
Fauna of Seychelles
Fauna of the Mascarene Islands
Fish of the Red Sea
Marine fauna of East Africa
Taxa named by Ernest A. Lachner
Taxa named by Susan J. Karnella
Fish described in 1978